The A68 is a major road in the United Kingdom, running from Darlington in England to the A720 in Edinburgh, the capital of Scotland. It crosses the Anglo-Scottish border at Carter Bar and is the only road to do so for some distance either way; the next major crossings are the A697 from Coldstream to Cornhill-on-Tweed in the east, and the A7 near Canonbie to the west.

Route

The southernmost section of the A68, as it leaves Darlington, has been described as a "rustbelt". In January 2022 there was a proposal to widen key roundabouts in Darlington to ease traffic flow. The road crosses the A1(M) at Copshaw Hill Interchange. It bypasses Bishop Auckland and runs through West Auckland, Toft Hill and Tow Law, where Durham County Council has installed a live camera so that drivers can check traffic and weather. It then passes Consett and Corbridge; it used to pass through the centre of the town but since 1979 has run on a bypass to the east, crossing the River Tyne over Styford Bridge. During the construction of the bypass, Roman burials, glass and coins were found, and some traces of Dere Street. The road passes through rural Northumberland, following the route of Dere Street for much of this stretch, which is considered highly scenic.

The A68 crosses the Scottish border at Carter Bar, then runs through the Border towns of Jedburgh, St Boswells, Earlston and Lauder before going over Soutra Hill, passing through Pathhead and by-passing Dalkeith, before terminating at Millerhill Junction on the A720. Until September 2008, the A68 passed through Dalkeith; the opening of a bypass removed large volumes of traffic from the town centre and led to a reduction in accidents. The northern section is used by commuters to Edinburgh, as well as long-distance traffic.

In August 2020 part of the road near Fala collapsed after heavy rain. It reopened the following month.

Part of the A68 is a trunk road from the boundary with Midlothian to the border at Carter Bar, managed by BEAR Scotland for Transport Scotland. The English section as far south as the junction with the A696 to Newcastle was previously a trunk road, but was detrunked in 2001 as part of the government's "New Deal for Trunk Roads in England" report published three years earlier.

Along with the A696, the A68 forms an alternative route between Newcastle Upon Tyne and Edinburgh to the A1 which runs along the coast via Berwick Upon Tweed, and is the more scenic of the two.

History
The A68 follows the Roman Dere Street north of Corbridge, crossing Hadrian's Wall, and shares its route as far as the historic camps of Habitancum and Bremenium. The area contains numerous Roman forts.

The current route across Carter Bar was proposed by John Loudon McAdam in 1828. It was constructed over the following decade, and featured bridges designed by James Jardine.

Safety
The A68 was the 20th most dangerous UK road in 2017. In 2021, the Scottish government announced funding for safety improvements in Pathhead. In England, some MPs have lobbied for similar safety improvements along the road.

See also
British road numbering scheme

References

External links

Roads in England
Roads in Scotland
Transport in County Durham
Transport in Northumberland
Transport in the Scottish Borders
Transport in Midlothian
Transport in Edinburgh
Roads in Northumberland